The 2018–19 Honduran Liga Nacional de Ascenso is the 52nd season of the Second level in Honduran football and the 17th under the name Liga Nacional de Ascenso.  The tournament is divided into two halves (Apertura and Clausura), each crowning one champion.

Apertura
The Apertura tournament runs from August to December 2018.  C.D. Real Sociedad won the tournament after defeating San Juan F.C. in the final series.

Regular season

Group A

Group B

Group C

Group D

Postseason

Play-offs

Quarterfinals

Semifinals

Final

Clausura
The Clausura tournament runs from January to May 2019.

Regular season

Group A

Group B

 Real Juventud disqualified from Championship Play-offs as they had to play for relegation Play-offs.

Group C

Group D

Postseason

Play-offs

Quarterfinals

Semifinals

Final

Promotion
C.D. Real Sociedad and Olancho F.C., the winners of both Apertura and Clausura respectively, faced to decide the team promoted to 2019–20 Honduran Liga Nacional.  Real Sociedad obtained promotion again after being relegated one year ago.

References

Ascenso
2018